David John Abruzzese (born 8 October 1969) is a Welsh former professional footballer. He represented Wales at youth level.

Abruzzese, a full-back, joined Newport County in 1986, playing 25 times in Newport's final two seasons in the Football League. In 1988, after County's second successive relegation and the club in financial ruin, he joined Torquay United, but left to join Merthyr Tydfil without making the Torquay first team.

He subsequently moved to Barry Town and in the 2001–02 and 2004–05 seasons was playing for ENTO Aberaman. He was appointed as manager in June 2004 but left the role in 2005. He later played for Penrhiwceiber Rangers and Osborne Athletic.

Personal life
Abruzzese has a son named Rhys who is also a footballer and was part of the academy at Cardiff City. His other son, Dewi, currently plays for Cambrian & Clydach Vale.

References 

1969 births
Living people
Footballers from Aberdare
Welsh footballers
Newport County A.F.C. players
Torquay United F.C. players
English Football League players
Barry Town United F.C. players
Merthyr Tydfil F.C. players
Association football fullbacks
Welsh people of Italian descent
Aberaman Athletic F.C. players
Welsh football managers